The Victor Meyer apparatus is the standard laboratory method for determining the molecular weight of a volatile liquid. It was developed by Viktor Meyer, who spelled his name Victor in publications at the time of its development. In this method, a known mass of a volatile solid or liquid under examination is converted into its vapour form by heating in a Victor Meyer's tube. The vapour displaces its own volume of air. The volume of air displaced at experimental temperature and pressure is calculated. Then volume of air displaced at standard temperature and pressure is calculated. Using this, mass of air displaced at 2.24 × 10−2 m3 of vapour at STP is calculated. This value represents the molecular mass of the substance. The apparatus consists of an inner Victor Meyer's tube, lower end of which is in form of a bulb. The upper end of tube has a side tube that leads to a trough filled with water. The Victor Meyer's tube is surrounded by an outer jacket. In the outer jacket, a liquid is placed, which boils at a temperature at least 30 K higher than the substance under examination. A small quantity of glass-wool or asbestos pad covers the lower end of the Victor Meyer's tube to prevent breakage, when a glass bottle containing the substance under examination is dropped to it

Procedure
The liquid in the outer jacket is heated until no more air escapes from the side tube. Then, a graduated tube  filled with water is inverted over the side tube dipping in a trough filled with water. A small quantity of substance is weighed exactly in a small stoppered bottle and is dropped in the Victor Meyer's tube and sealed immediately. The bottle falls on the asbestos pad and its contents suddenly change into vapour, blows out the stopper and displaces an equal volume of air in graduated tube. The volume of air displaced is measured by taking the graduated tube out, closing its mouth with thumb and dipping in a jar filled with water. When water levels inside and outside the tube is equal, the volume of air displaced is noted. The atmospheric pressure and laboratory temperature are noted.

Victor Meyer method of alcohol distinction
Victor Meyer suggested a method for determining the types of alcohol i.e. (primary, secondary or tertiary). In this method the sample alcohol is treated with PI3 to get the iodoalkane which is again treated with AgNO2 to get the nitroalkane. The nitroalkane is then treated with nitrous acid which is obtained by NaNO2 and HCl. The resulting solution is treated with KOH and the colour is observed. The red, blue and no colour indicates the primary, secondary and tertiary alcohol respectively.

References
 
General Chemistry-John Russel by McGraw Hill International Editions 3rd edition
University General Chemistry-An Introduction to Chemical Science edited by CNR Rao by McMillan Indian Ltd.
Inorganic Chemistry, by P.L.Soni
Tamil Nadu State Board class 11 textbook vol.1 page-31.

Laboratory equipment